An Act Declaring War between the United Kingdom of Great Britain and Ireland and the Dependencies Thereof and the United States of America and Their Territories was passed by the 12th United States Congress on June 18, 1812, thereby beginning the War of 1812. It was signed by James Madison, the 4th President of the United States.

Text of the declaration

Response

References

1812 in international relations
1812 in the United Kingdom
1812 in the United States
War of 1812
United Kingdom
June 1812 events
1812 documents